A prime suspect is the person who is considered by the law enforcement agency investigating a crime to be the most likely suspect.

Prime Suspect or Prime Suspects may also refer to:

Film
 Prime Suspect, a 1982 American television film directed by Noel Black
 Prime Suspect (film), a 1989 American thriller film directed by Bruce Kimmel

Television
 Prime Suspect, a 1991–2006 British police procedural television drama series
 Prime Suspect 1973, a 2017 prequel to the British drama series
 Prime Suspect (American TV series), an NBC television drama series adapted from the British series
 Prime Suspect (American TV program), a syndicated television program that aired from 1992 to 1995.
 "Prime Suspect" (NCIS), the 17th episode of the tenth season of the American police procedural drama NCIS

Other
 Prime Suspects, an American rap group
 Prime Suspects: The Anatomy of Integers and Permutations, a graphic novel about mathematical concepts
 Mystery Case Files: Prime Suspects, a 2006 video game in the Mystery Case Files series